California Trout is a San Francisco-based 501(c)(3) conservation group with a mission to ensure resilient wild fish in California waters.

California Trout have three conservation initiatives focused on:

 Strongholds
 Source Water Areas
 Wild Fish, Working Landscapes

Initially organized in the mid-1960s as a local unit of Trout Unlimited, the founders formed CalTrout during Christmas week of 1970 and filed papers of incorporation the following January. Among its founding officers and board members were a doctor, insurance broker, public relations executive, tackle shop owner, and a real estate agent.

Today the organization is working on more than 30 conservation and fisheries projects statewide, has over 5,000 members, five regional offices, and a full-time presence in Sacramento. Its headquarters are in San Francisco.

In 2018, the Department of the Interior of the Trump administration began to consider a proposal initiated by California Trout and Restore Hetch Hetchy to allow limited boating on the Hetch Hetchy Reservoir for the first time, with representatives of the two organizations arguing that "San Francisco received [Hetch Hetchy's] benefits long ago, but the American people have not."

See also
Conservation in the United States

References

Fish conservation organizations
Environmental organizations based in California
Nature conservation organizations based in the United States
Environmental organizations established in 1970
1970 establishments in California